Kadri Ottis (born 19 April 1970) is an Estonian historian and politician. She was a member of VIII Riigikogu, representing the Estonian Coalition Party.
 Ottis was born in Pärnu and graduated from the University of Tartu in 1995 with a degree in history.

References

Living people
1970 births
21st-century Estonian historians
Estonian women historians
Estonian Coalition Party politicians
Members of the Riigikogu, 1995–1999
Women members of the Riigikogu
University of Tartu alumni
Politicians from Pärnu